Ramila thectopetina is a moth in the family Crambidae. It was described by West in 1931. It is found in the Philippines (Luzon).

References

Moths described in 1931
Schoenobiinae